Philip "Spike" Edney (born 11 December 1951) is an English musician who, since the 1960s, has performed with a number of bands, most notably with Queen in their live concerts, where his participation started in 1984 during Queen's The Works tour. During the mid-1970s, he recorded and toured with The Tymes and Ben E. King. He is primarily known for playing keyboards but also plays bass, guitar, trombone and contributes backing vocals. Subsequently, in the late 1970s, he was musical director for Edwin Starr and, during the early 1980s, worked with Duran Duran, The Boomtown Rats, Dexys Midnight Runners, Bucks Fizz, Haircut One Hundred and The Rolling Stones. He also appeared with Peter Green on his comeback tour.

Edney's collaboration with Queen included mostly keyboards (his main instrument), plus rhythm guitar and backing vocals. Accompanying the band on its tours since 1984, replacing Fred Mandel. He was also part of Roger Taylor's side project The Cross as well as Brian May's band when they toured in 1993 and 1998.

Edney can be seen on Queen's Live at Wembley Stadium and Hungarian Rhapsody concert films, playing rhythm guitar on "Hammer to Fall," and piano on both "Crazy Little Thing Called Love" and "Tutti Frutti." He can also be seen playing in the background during Queen's 1985 Live Aid performance at Wembley Stadium.

SAS Band 
Edney formed SAS Band (Spike's All Stars) in 1994, playing their first gig at The Gosport Festival (near Edney's hometown of Portsmouth). The original band featured Cozy Powell on drums, Neil Murray on bass and Jamie Moses on guitar. The band has constantly fluctuating personnel, including musicians from Queen, Whitesnake, Free, Roxy Music, Toto, and Spandau Ballet, and solo artists including Fish, Roy Wood, Leo Sayer, Kiki Dee, and Paul Young. Others that have appeared with the band include Suggs, Lionel Richie, Bob Geldof and Toyah Willcox.

Other roles with Queen 

After the death of Freddie Mercury (who was Queen's main pianist), Edney took over Mercury's role on piano during Queen + Paul Rodgers 2005, 2006, and 2008 tours, playing all piano parts on a Korg Triton keyboard, in addition to all other keyboard parts. He returned as keyboardist for the Queen + Adam Lambert tours in 2012, 2014, and the 2015–2020 tour schedule.  He has also been the keyboardist for the London production of We Will Rock You since it opened in 2002.

Edney was also the musical director of the official Queen tribute band, the Queen Extravaganza.

Equipment 
During tours with Queen in the mid 1980s, Edney played a Gibson Les Paul Junior as his main guitar for the rhythm parts of "Hammer to Fall". During the Queen + Paul Rogers tours he used a Korg Triton before settling on a Korg M3 for Queen + Adam Lambert tours.

Selected discography

Albums 
 Queen: A Kind of Magic (1986)
 Queen: Live Magic (1986)
 The Cross: Shove It (1987)
 The Cross: Mad, Bad and Dangerous to Know (1990)
 The Cross: Blue Rock (1991)
 Lucio Battisti: Cosa succederà alla ragazza (1992)
 Queen: Live at Wembley '86 (1992)
 The Brian May Band: Live at the Brixton Academy (1994)
 SAS Band: SAS Band (1997)
 Brian May: Another World (1998; keyboards on "Slow Down")
 SAS Band: The Show (2001)
 Queen + Paul Rodgers: Return of the Champions (CD/DVD, 2005)
 Queen + Paul Rodgers: Live in Ukraine (CD/DVD, 2009)
Queen: Hungarian Rhapsody (2012)
Queen + Adam Lambert: Live in Japan (2016)
 Queen: Bohemian Rhapsody: The Original Soundtrack (2018)
Queen + Adam Lambert: Live Around The World (2020)

Videos 
 Queen: Live in Rio (VHS/DVD, 1985/2013)
Queen: We Are The Champions: Final Live in Japan (1992)
 Queen: Live at Wembley Stadium (VHS/DVD, 1990/2003/2011)
 Queen: The Freddie Mercury Tribute Concert (VHS/DVD, 1992/2002/2013)
 The Brian May Band: Live at the Brixton Academy (VHS, 1994)
 46664 – The Event (DVD, 2004)
 Live Aid (DVD, 2004)
 Queen + Paul Rodgers: Return of the Champions (CD/DVD, 2005)
 Queen + Paul Rodgers: Super Live in Japan (DVD, 2006)
 Queen + Paul Rodgers: Live in Ukraine (CD/DVD, 2009)
Queen: Hungarian Rhapsody (2012)
 Queen + Adam Lambert: Live in Japan (2016)
Queen + Béjart: Ballet For Life (2019)
Queen + Adam Lambert: Live Around The World (2020)

References

External links 

SAS Band website
Spike Edney interviewed on RadioLIVE, New Zealand, following Sacha Baron Cohen to play Freddie Mercury announcement

English rock musicians
Queen (band)
Living people
1951 births
Musicians from Portsmouth
People from Hackney Central
English rock keyboardists
English rock pianists
English rock guitarists
Queen + Adam Lambert members
Queen + Paul Rodgers members
The Cross (band) members
Peter Green Splinter Group members